Lobkovo is a rural locality (a village) in Krasnoplamenskoye Rural Settlement, Alexandrovsky District, Vladimir Oblast, Russia. The population was 240 as of 2010. There are 6 streets.

Geography 
Lobkovo is located 29 km northwest of Alexandrov (the district's administrative centre) by road. Sushchyovo is the nearest rural locality.

References 

Rural localities in Alexandrovsky District, Vladimir Oblast